Doug Richey is a Missouri politician serving in the Missouri House of Representatives from the 39th district. In his first two elections, he was elected from district 38, but redistricting in 2022 placed his home in district 39.

Missouri House of Representatives

Committee assignments 
 Joint Committee on Education – Chairman
 Federal Stimulus Appropriations Committee - Chairman
 Rules – Legislative Oversight – Vice Chairman
 Fiscal Review – Vice Chairman
 Budget
 Emerging Issues
 Subcommittee on Appropriations – Health, Mental Health and Social Services

Electoral history

References

21st-century American politicians
Republican Party members of the Missouri House of Representatives
Living people
Year of birth missing (living people)